The list of echinoderms of South Africa is a list of species that form a part of the echinoderm (Phylum Echinodermata) fauna of South Africa, and includes the starfish, feather stars, brittle stars, sea urchins and sea cucumbers. The list follows the SANBI listing on iNaturalist.

Subphylum Asterozoa

Class Asteroidea

Superorder Forcipulatacea, order Forcipulatida

Family Asteriidae
 
Coscinasterias calamaria (Gray, 1840) Many armed sea star		
Marthasterias glacialis (Linnaeus, 1758) Spiny starfish

Superorder Spinulosacea, order Spinulosida

Family Echinasteridae
 
Henricia ornata (Perrier, 1869) Reticulated starfish

Superorder Valvatacea, order Paxillosida

Family Astropectinidae
 
Astropecten granulatus Müller & Troschel, 1842 Grey sandstar
Astropecten hemprichi Müller & Troschel, 1842 		
Astropecten irregularis pontoporeus Sladen, 1883 Pink sandstar

Order Valvatida,

Family Acanthasteridae
 
Acanthaster planci (Linnaeus, 1758) Crown of thorns starfish

Family Asterinidae
 
Aquilonastra burtoni  (Gray, 1840)	
Asterina stellifera (Möbius, 1859) Namibian cushion star 	
Callopatiria granifera (Gray, 1847) Red starfish 	
Parvulastra exigua (Lamarck, 1816) Dwarf cushion star
Patiriella dyscrita (H.L. Clark, 1923) Granular cushion star

Family Goniasteridae
 
Calliaster baccatus Sladen, 1889 Cobbled sea star, tiled sea star
Fromia elegans H.L. Clark, 1921 Blocked starfish		
Fromia indica (Perrier, 1869)

Family Mithrodiidae
 
Thromidia catalai Pope & Rowe, 1977 Fat armed star

Family Ophidiasteridae
 
Austrofromia schultzei (Döderlein, 1910)  Granular starfish	
Linckia guildingi Gray, 1840 		
Linckia laevigata (Linnaeus, 1758) Blue star
Linckia multifora (Lamarck, 1816)		
Narcissia spp.					
Nardoa variolata (Retzius, 1805) Button star

Family Oreasteridae
 
Choriaster granulatus Lütken, 1869 Granulated star
Culcita schmideliana (Retzius, 1805) Pincushion starfish
Halityle regularis Fisher, 1913 Regular star
Protoreaster lincki (Blainville, 1830) Spine tipped star
Pentaceraster mammillatus (Audouin, 1826) Beaded starfish

Family Pterasteridae
 
Euretaster cribrosus (von Martens, 1867)
Pteraster capensis Gray, 1847 Brooding cushion star

Class Ophiuroidea

Order Euryalida

Family Gorgonocephalidae
 
Astroboa nuda (Lyman, 1874) Naked basket star			
Astrocladus euryale (Retzius, 1783) Basket star

Superfamily Euryalidea

Family Asteroschematidae
 
Asteroschema capensis Mortensen, 1925

Family Euryalidae, Subfamily Euryalinae
 
Euryale spp.

Order Ophiurida, Suborder Ophiurina, Infraorder Gnathophiurina

Family Amphiuridae
 
Amphiura (Amphiura) capensis Ljungman, 1867 Equal tailed brittlestar
Amphioplus (Lymanella) integer (Ljungman, 1867)
Amphipholis squamata (Delle Chiaje, 1828)
Ophiodaphne scripta (Koehler, 1904) Pansy-shell brittlestar

Family Ophiactidae
 
Ophiactis carnea Ljungman, 1867 Snake-star
Ophiactis savignyi (Müller & Troschel, 1842)

Family Ophiocomidae, Subfamily Ophiocominae
 
Ophiocoma (Breviturma) brevipes Peters, 1851
Ophiocoma (Breviturma) dentata Müller & Troschel, 1842
Ophiocoma (Breviturma) doederleini de Loriol, 1899
Ophiocoma erinaceus Müller & Troschel, 1842
Ophiocoma pica Müller & Troschel, 1842
Ophiocoma pusilla (Brock, 1888)
Ophiocoma scolopendrina (Lamarck, 1816)
Ophiocoma valenciae Müller & Troschel, 1842 Snake armed brittlestar

Family Ophionereididae
 
Ophionereis dubia dubia (Müller & Troschel, 1842) Striped brittlestar
Ophionereis porrecta Lyman, 1860 Striped brittlestar

Family Ophiotrichidae
 
Macrophiothrix hirsuta cheneyi (Lyman, 1862)
Ophiocnemis marmorata (Lamarck, 1816) Hitchhiker brittlestar
Ophiothela danae Verrill, 1869 Commensal brittlestar
Ophiothrix (Acanthophiothrix) purpurea von Martens, 1867		
Ophiothrix (Ophiothrix) foveolata Marktanner-Turneretscher, 1887
Ophiothrix fragilis (Abildgaard, in O.F. Müller, 1789) Hairy brittlestar
Ophiothrix fragilis var. triglochis Müller & Troschel, 1842

Infraorder Ophiodermatina

Family Ophiodermatidae

Subfamily Ophiarachninae
 
Ophiarachnella capensis (Bell, 1888) Banded brittlestar

Subfamily Ophiodermatinae
 
Ophioderma wahlbergii Müller & Troschel, 1842 	Serpent skinned brittlestar

Subphylum Crinozoa

Class Crinoidea, subclass Articulata

Order Comatulida, sub-order Comatulidina

Super-family Antedonoidea, family Antedonidae, subfamily Antedoninae
 
Annametra occidentalis (AH Clark, 1915)

Superfamily Comasteroidea, family Comatulidae, subfamily Comatulinae
 
Comanthus wahlbergii (Müller, 1843) Common feather star

Superfamily Mariametroidea, family Mariametridae
 
Stephanometra indica (Smith, 1876) Indicated feather star

Superfamily Tropiometroidea, family Tropiometridae
 
Tropiometra carinata (Lamarck, 1816) Elegant feather star

Subphylum Echinozoa

Class Echinoidea, subclass Cidaroidea

Order Cidaroida

Superfamily Cidaridea, family Cidaridae, subfamily Cidarinae

Eucidaris metularia (Lamarck, 1816)
Phyllacanthus imperialis (Lamarck, 1816)

Subfamily Stylocidarinae

Prionocidaris pistillaris (Lamarck, 1816) Rough pencil urchin

Subclass Euechinoidea, infraclass Acroechinoidea

Order Diadematoida

Family Diadematidae

Astropyga radiata (Leske, 1778)
Diadema savignyi (Audouin, 1829) Needle urchin
Diadema setosum (Leske, 1778) Needle urchin
Echinothrix calamaris (Pallas, 1774) Banded urchin

Infraclass Carinacea

Superorder Echinacea, order Arbacioida

Family Arbaciidae

Tetrapygus niger (Molina, 1782) Black urchin

Order Camarodonta, infraorder Echinidea

Family Echinidae

Echinus gilchristi Bell, 1904 Deep water urchin

Family Parechinidae

Parechinus angulosus (Leske, 1778) Cape urchin

Superfamily Odontophora, family Echinometridae

Colobocentrotus (Podophora) atratus (Linnaeus, 1758) 	
Echinometra mathaei (Blainville, 1825) Oval urchin
Echinostrephus molaris (Blainville, 1825) Tuft urchin
Heterocentrotus mamillatus (Linnaeus, 1758) Slate pencil urchin

Family Toxopneustidae

Toxopneustes pileolus (Lamarck, 1816) Flower urchin
Tripneustes gratilla (Linnaeus, 1758) Short-spined urchin

Infraorder Temnopleuridea

Family Temnopleuridae

Salmacis bicolor L. Agassiz in L. Agassiz & Desor, 1846 Bicoloured urchin

Order Stomopneustoida

Family Stomopneustidae

Stomopneustes variolaris (Lamarck, 1816) Pot-hole urchin

Infraclass Irregularia

Superorder Atelostomata, order Spatangoida, suborder Brissidina

Superfamily Spatangidea, family Loveniidae, subfamily Echinocardiinae

Echinocardium cordatum (Pennant, 1777) Heart urchin
Lovenia elongata (Gray, 1845)

Family Maretiidae

Spatagobrissus mirabilis H.L. Clark, 1923 Heart urchin

Superorder Neognathostomata, order Clypeasteroida, suborder Scutellina, infraorder Scutelliformes

Superfamily Scutellidea, family Astriclypeidae

Echinodiscus auritus Leske, 1778 Pansy shell
Echinodiscus bisperforatus Leske, 1778 Pansy shell

Infraorder Laganiformes

Family Echinocyamidae

Echinocyamus sp.

Order Echinolampadoida

Family Echinolampadidae

Echinolampas crassa (Bell, 1880) Lamp urchin

Class Holothuroidea

Order Apodida

Family Chiridotidae

Taeniogyrus dayi Cherbonnier, 1952

Family Synaptidae

Leptosynapta knysnaensis(Cherbonnier, 1952) 	
Synapta maculata (Chamisso & Eysenhardt, 1821) Snake sea cucumber

Order Aspidochirotida

Family Holothuriidae

Bohadschia subrubra (Quoy & Gaimard, 1834)
Holothuria (Halodeima) atra Jaeger, 1833
Holothuria (Mertensiothuria) leucospilota (Brandt, 1835) Tapering sea cucumber
Holothuria (Metriatyla) scabra Jaeger, 1833
Holothuria (Microthele) nobilis (Selenka, 1867) Noble sea cucumber
Holothuria (Selenkothuria) parva Krauss in Lampert, 1885 Banana sea cucumber
Holothuria (Semperothuria) cinerascens (Brandt, 1835) Tufted sea cucumber

Family Stichopodidae

Neostichopus grammatus (H.L. Clark, 1923) Warty sea cucumber
Stichopus chloronotus 	Brandt, 1835
Thelenota ananas (Jaeger, 1833) Pineapple sea cucumber

Order Dendrochirotida

Family Cucumariidae

Aslia spyridophora (H.L. Clark, 1923) Grey sea cucumber syn. Cucumaria spyridophora, Pentacucumis spyridophora 
Pentacta doliolum (Pallas, 1766) Cask sea cucumber, mauve sea cucumber	
Pseudocnella insolens (Théel, 1886) Red-chested sea cucumber syn. Cucumaria insolens  Théel, 1886 
Pseudocnella sykion (Lampert, 1885) Black sea cucumber syn. Cucumaria sykion (Lampert, 1885) 
Roweia stephensoni (John, 1939) Stephenson's sea cucumber syn. Cucumaria stephensoni John, 1939 
Roweia frauenfeldi frauenfeldi (Ludwig, 1882) Horseshoe sea cucumber syn. Cucumaria frauenfeldi Ludwig, 1882  	
Trachasina crucifera (Semper, 1869) syn. Trachythyone crucifera (Semper, 1869)

Family Psolidae

Psolus griffithsi Thandar, 2009

Family Phyllophoridae
 
Stolus buccalis (Stimpson, 1855) syn. Thyone sacellus (Selenka)
Thyone aurea (Quoy & Gaimard, 1834) Golden sea cucumber

Notes

References

Marine biodiversity of South Africa
South Africa
South African animal biodiversity lists